Sepandārmazgān or Espandegān (اسپندگان), is an ancient Iranian day of women with Zoroastrian roots dating back to the first Persian Empire, the Achaemenid Empire.
This day is dedicated to Spənta Ārmaiti (Avestan for "Holy Devotion",  in Middle Persian,   or ), the Amesha Spenta who is given the domain of "earth".  The date of the festival as observed in the Sassanid era was on the 5th day of the month Spandarmad. When the name of the day and the month of the day were the same, a "name-feast" celebration was always done.
According to the testimony of al-Biruni, in the 11th century CE there was a festival when the names of the day and the month were the same. The deity Spandarmad protected the Earth and the "good, chaste and beneficent wife who loves her husband". According to him, the festival used to be dedicated to women, and men would make them "liberal presents", and the custom was still flourishing in some districts of Fahla.

Barzegaran Festival 

The jashn-e barzegarán (Festival of Agriculturists), is celebrated in Iran also on the 5th day of Spandarmad month (the Spandarmad day). People pray for good harvest, honor the deity of Earth Spandārmad, and put signs on doors to destroy evil spirits.

The observation of this festival has been revived in modern Iran, where it is mostly set on the 5th day of Esfand in the Solar Hejri calendar introduced in 1925, corresponding to 24 February. The modern festival is a celebration day of love towards mothers and wives.

Historical festival
Descriptions of this festival are given in medieval historiographical sources such as Gardizi, Biruni  and Abu al-Hasan al-Mas'udi.

According to Biruni, it was a day where women rested and men had to bring them gifts.  In the section about Persian calendar, Biruni writes in The Remaining Signs of Past Centuries that:

Furthermore, Biruni notes that on this day, commoners ate raisins and pomegranate seeds. 
According to Gardizi, this celebration was special for women, and they called this day also  (possessing of men).

Modern revival
The revival of the festival dates to the Pahlavi dynasty, advocated by Ebrahim Pourdavoud as "Nurses' Day" in 1962.

The date of the modern festival is on the 5th of Esfand in the Iranian calendar (24 February) due to the reorganization of the calendar, once by Omar Khayyam in the 11th century.

See also 
Persian culture
Iranian woman

Notes

Persian culture
Iranian culture
Festivals in Iran
Persian words and phrases
February observances
Zoroastrian festivals
Observances set by the Solar Hijri calendar
Winter events in Iran
Days celebrating love